Fermín Aldeguer Mengual (born 5 April 2005) is a Spanish motorcycle road racer, competing in Moto2 for the Speed Up Racing Team.

Career
Aldeguer competed in the European Talent Cup in 2018 & 2019 before moving up to the FIM CEV Moto2 European Championship where he won the title in 2021 season.

Moto2 World Championship

2021-present
In 2021 he made several replacement appearances for the injured and suspended Yari Montella in Moto2 category, while competing full time in MotoE with the Aspar Team. He eventually replaced Montella for the last four rounds of the Moto2 season after the MotoE campaign ended in Misano. He ended the 2021 Moto2 campaign with two point scoring finishes in eight races, a 12th place in Mugello, and a 7th place in Aragon.

At the end of the 2021 season, Aldeguer and the Speed Up team came to a new, three-year contract agreement.

Career statistics

Grand Prix motorcycle racing

By season

By class

Races by year
(key) (Races in bold indicate pole position; races in italics indicate fastest lap)

References

External links

 
 

2005 births
Living people
Moto2 World Championship riders
MotoE World Cup riders
Sportspeople from Murcia